Myiochaeta is a genus of parasitic flies in the family Tachinidae.

Species
Myiochaeta marnefi Cortés, 1967

Distribution
Chile.

References

Dexiinae
Diptera of South America
Tachinidae genera
Monotypic Brachycera genera